Jassen Andrew Cullimore (born December 4, 1972) is a Canadian former professional ice hockey defenceman.

Cullimore grew up in Port Dover, Ontario playing the majority of his minor hockey with the Clippers of the OMHA.  He played Jr.C. hockey at age 14 for the Caledonia Corvairs and then played as a 15-year-old with the Simcoe Storm Jr.C. club in 1987-88.  After being drafted in the third round of the 1988 OHL draft by the Peterborough Petes, Cullimore spent the majority of the 1988-89 season with the Peterborough Road Runners of the Metro Jr.B. Hockey League (OHA).

Playing career

Cullimore was drafted with the 29th pick of the second round of the 1991 NHL Entry Draft by the Vancouver Canucks. In 1996, he was traded to the Montreal Canadiens for Donald Brashear. He was later claimed on  waivers by the Tampa Bay Lightning in 1998, where he played until 2004 when he signed a free agent deal with the Chicago Blackhawks after winning the Stanley Cup with Tampa. He remained in Chicago until June 2007, where he was traded back to Montreal in exchange for Sergei Samsonov and Tony Salmelainen. He was released by Montreal soon after. After failing to make the Detroit Red Wings roster during a pre-season tryout in 2007, he signed a free agent deal with Florida. Cullimore then became an unrestricted free agent after the Florida Panthers decided not to re-sign him. He re-signed a one-year deal at the start of the 2008–2009 season with the Florida Panthers.

On February 17, 2010, Cullimore signed a two-way contract with the Chicago Blackhawks, and was assigned to their American Hockey League affiliate, the Rockford IceHogs. Cullimore was called up to Chicago on October 15, 2010.

Career statistics

External links 

1972 births
Canadian expatriate ice hockey players in Germany
Canadian ice hockey defencemen
Chicago Blackhawks players
Florida Panthers players
Fredericton Canadiens players
Hamilton Canucks players
Ice hockey people from Ontario
Iserlohn Roosters players
Living people
Montreal Canadiens players
Sportspeople from Norfolk County, Ontario
Peterborough Petes (ice hockey) players
Rochester Americans players
Rockford IceHogs (AHL) players
Stanley Cup champions
Syracuse Crunch players
Tampa Bay Lightning players
Vancouver Canucks draft picks
Vancouver Canucks players